Priscakoala is an extinct genus of koala from the Early Miocene of Riversleigh, Australia. It has one species: Priscakoala lucyturnbullae.

The prefix "prisca" comes from the Latin meaning old, ancient, primeval or primitive. It was used to indicate that this genus is one of the oldest and simplest form of the koala. The species P. lucyturnbullae was named for Lucy Turnbull a businesswoman, wife of former Prime Minister Malcolm Turnbull, and supporter of the research that discovered the genus.

References

Prehistoric vombatiforms
Koalas
Prehistoric marsupial genera
Miocene mammals of Australia
Miocene marsupials
Riversleigh fauna